The cream containing the drug combination fluocinolone acetonide/hydroquinone/tretinoin (trade name Tri-Luma) is used for the treatment of melasma (dark skin patches). It is marketed by Galderma.

References

Dermatologic drugs
Combination drugs